Gessesse is a surname. Notable people with the surname include:

 Tesfaye Gessesse (1936–2020), Ethiopian actor
 Tilahun Gessesse (1940–2009), Ethiopian singer

Surnames of Ethiopian origin